Ernst Erich Otto Peters  (March 11, 1920 – December 20, 2012) was a Swedish gymnast who competed at the 1952 Summer Olympics in Helsinki. He had his best individual finish in the men's parallel bars event, where he placed 74th. He also competed with the Swedish team in the all-around tournament, coming 17th out of 23 nations. He was born in Kreuzlingen, Switzerland and competed out of Sandvikens Gymnastikavdelning.

References

External links
Erich Peters' profile at the Swedish Olympic Committee 

1920 births
2012 deaths
Swedish male artistic gymnasts
Olympic gymnasts of Sweden
Gymnasts at the 1952 Summer Olympics
People from Kreuzlingen